The Upper Arrow Lake Ferry is a ferry across Upper Arrow Lake in the West Kootenay region of southeastern British Columbia.

Arrowhead–Beaton
In 1896, the Canadian Pacific Railway's (CP) Revelstoke–Arrowhead branch line opened along the east side of the Columbia River. At that time, the Arrowhead–Thomson's Landing (former name of Beaton), head of the lake, east–west ferry service commenced. CP gradually withdrew its sternwheelers from the lake. By 1942, only the Minto remained. In 1954, CP abandoned the lake.

Beaton–Galena Bay–Arrowhead
In 1916, James C. Fitzsimmons began this upper lake service, subsidized by the province. Initially chartering the CP tug Columbia, he soon bought the  Yale. In 1928, the Beaton Boat Co. became the operator, using its new steam tug Beaton to push a barge. In 1944, the Beaton Navigation Co. acquired the business. In 1953, the Arrow Lake Transportation Co. became the operator. The next year, the subsidy ended, and the Interior Tug and Transport Co. won the contract for a Beaton–Arrowhead–Nakusp–Castlegar service. The 13-vehicle capacity diesel ferry Arrow Park made three trips weekly. In 1956, the British Columbia Ministry of Transportation took over the route and bought the vessel, renaming it the Lardeau.

Arrowhead–Galena Bay
In 1957, the most easterly terminal relocated from Beaton to Galena Bay. In 1968, the Arrowhead branch line closed, the western ferry terminal relocated to Shelter Bay (after the reservoir for the Keenleyside Dam flooded the former Arrowhead), and ferry fares were eliminated on the Upper Arrow Lake.

Shelter Bay–Galena Bay

Announced in 1965, and implemented within a few years, were the construction of a new Revelstoke–Shelter Bay road along the west side of the Columbia, the introduction of a Shelter Bay–Galena Bay ferry, and a major upgrade to the Nakusp–Galena Bay road.

Timeline
1969: DEV Galena with a 35-vehicle, 200-passenger capacity (built 1968), replaced the 12 Mile and 24 Mile ferries.
1990: DEV Galena modified to a 50-vehicle, 150-passenger capacity vessel. MV Needles relocated from Needles Ferry route and renamed MV Shelter Bay (built 1969).
2002: The service, which operated 5am to 1am, was reduced to 6am to midnight.
2004: Western Pacific Marine became the service contractor.
2007: By this time, service was 6:30am to 11:30pm.
2008: Service was restored as 5am to 1am.
c.2013: WaterBridge Ferries became the service provider.
2014: Designed and built by WaterBridge Steel at Nakusp, the 80-vehicle, 250-passenger capacity
MV Columbia was introduced to replace the two smaller vessels. Wider lanes and improved ramp transitions allowed faster loading and unloading.
2020: A vehicle drove off the Shelter Bay terminal ahead of the incoming ferry. The driver, who was rescued, did not suffer any major injuries. An underwater dive team attached a tow truck cable to the submerged vehicle, which was lifted from the water.

Operation
The ferry operates under contract to the British Columbia Ministry of Transportation and Infrastructure and is free of tolls, as are all inland ferries in British Columbia. The MV Columbia sails every thirty minutes, from the first departure from Shelter Bay at 5am until the last at midnight, with a crossing time of about twenty minutes (the first and last departures are 5:30am and 12:30am from Galena Bay). The ferry has capacity for 80 vehicles and 250 passengers.

See also
Adams Lake Cable Ferry
Albion Ferry
Arrow Park Ferry
Barnston Island Ferry
Big Bar Ferry
Francois Lake Ferry
Glade Cable Ferry
Harrop Ferry
Kootenay Lake Ferry
Lytton Ferry
Little Fort Ferry
McLure Ferry
Needles Ferry
Usk Ferry

Footnotes

References

Ferries of British Columbia
Arrow Lakes
Crossings of the Columbia River
Canadian Pacific Railway